The ringwork on the Schießberg is a, now levelled, early medieval hillfort situated at a height of  on the Schießberg, about 1,100 metres northeast of the church of Unterstürmig, a village in the market municipality of Eggolsheim in the county of Forchheim in the south German state of Bavaria.

Of the former castle, only circular ramparts and moat remnants have survived.

Literature 
 Hansjürgen Brachmann: Der frühmittelalterliche Befestigungsbau in Mitteleuropa. Untersuchungen zu seiner Entwicklung und Funktion im germanisch-deutschen Bereich. In: Schriften zur Ur- und Frühgeschichte. 45. Akademie Verlag, Berlin, 1993, .
 Björn-Uwe Abels: Führer zu archäologischen Denkmälern in Bayern, Franken Band 2: Archäologischer Führer Oberfranken. Konrad Theiss Verlag, Stuttgart, 1986, pp. 127–129.
 Klaus Schwarz: Die vor- und frühgeschichtlichen Geländedenkmäler Oberfrankens. (Materialhefte zur bayerischen Vorgeschichte, Series B, Vol. 5). Verlag Michael Laßleben, Kallmünz, 1955, p. 60.

External links 
 

Forchheim (district)
Castles in Bavaria
Eggolsheim